Daphnella hayesi is a species of sea snail, a marine gastropod mollusk in the family Raphitomidae.

Description
The length of the shell attains 10 mm.

Distribution
This marine species occurs off the Virgin Islands, Guadeloupe and Antigua

References

External links
 

hayesi
Gastropods described in 1959